Flaxby is a village and civil parish in the Harrogate district of North Yorkshire, England.

Flaxby  was once part of the wapentake of Claro. 
It is also part of the ecclesiastical parish of Goldsborough (St Mary).

In 1994, an Early Iron Age farmstead of the 7th–6th centuries BC was discovered by archaeologists, but the site was abandoned until the late Roman period.

Proposals have been put forward to develop the land to the east of Flaxby, north of the A59 road and west of the A1(M) motorway into a new town called Flaxby Park. The development would also include a bus park and ride system with the possibility of a new railway station on the York to Harrogate line. A railway station has already been proposed at Flaxby Moor (south of the A59) but in 2014, a feasibility study of new stations predicted a low demand of passenger numbers from a new station on the line.

References

External links

Villages in North Yorkshire
Civil parishes in North Yorkshire